Avi-Cenna International School is a government-approved co-educational British curriculum school located in the GRA part of Ikeja in Lagos State. Founded in 1989, the school focuses on the "promotion of moral and ethical values" with the view of "developing interpersonal and leadership skills" of her students.

History
The word "Avi-Cenna" was coined out from the name of a renowned Persian polymath named Avicenna. Founded in 1989 by Mr. and Mrs. Foudeh who were Jordanese immigrants, Avi-Cenna International School began educational activities with seventy pioneer students and eight teachers.

Administration and structure
Headed by Adeolu Adesanya who serves as the Principal, Avi-Cenna International School is a boarding and day school for children from the age of 2 to 15 years.

See also
List of schools in Lagos

References

External links
Official website

Secondary schools in Lagos State
1989 establishments in Nigeria
Schools in Lagos
Educational institutions established in 1989
Primary schools in Nigeria